Ruggero Oddi  (July 20, 1864 – March 22, 1913) was an Italian physiologist and anatomist who was a native of Perugia. He is most well known for the Sphincter of Oddi, which was named after him.

Biography
He studied medicine at Perugia, University of Bologna and Florence, and in 1894 was appointed head of the Physiology Institute at the University of Genoa. In 1900 he was relieved of his position at Genoa because of narcotics usage and fiscal improprieties. Later, he sought employment as a doctor with the Belgian colonial medical service, and spent some time working in the Belgian Congo. Oddi died on March 22, 1913 in Tunis, Tunisia.

While still a student, in 1887, 23-year-old Oddi described a small group of circular and longitudinal muscle fibers that wrapped around the end of the bile and pancreatic ducts in 1887. This structure was later to be known as the eponymous "sphincter of Oddi". Oddi was not the original discoverer of the sphincter; English physician Francis Glisson initially identified it two centuries earlier, however it was Oddi who was first able to characterize its physiological properties.

Inflammation of the junction of the duodenum and common bile duct at the sphincter of Oddi is referred to as "odditis".

References

Sources

 

 

Italian physiologists
1864 births
1913 deaths
University of Perugia alumni
University of Bologna alumni
University of Florence alumni
Academic staff of the University of Genoa
Italian anatomists
People from Perugia